A cultural festival is a celebration of the traditions of a particular people or place.

Cultural Festival may also refer to:

Africa
 Mangaung African Cultural Festival, Bloemfontein, South Africa
 Maragoli Cultural Festival, Kenya
 Morija Arts & Cultural Festival, Morija, Lesotho, Africa

Asia

India
 Cultural Festival (India), organized by colleges in India
 Waves cultural festival, Birla Institute of Technology and Science, Pilani – Goa Campus, India
 World Cultural Festival, 2016, held New Delhi, India

Other Asian countries
 Borneo Cultural Festival, Sibu, Sarawak, Malaysia
 Cultural festival (Japan), held by most schools in Japan
 National Cultural Festival, hosted by different cities in Japan
 Qurain Cultural Festival, Kuwait
 Seorak Cultural Festival, in Sokcho city, Gangwon Province, South Korea
 Uyghur Doppa Cultural Festival, for Uyghur people living in Xinjiang Uyghur Autonomous Region, China

North America
 Adäka Cultural Festival, Whitehorse, Yukon, Canada
 Harlem Cultural Festival, Manhattan, New York City, U.S.
 Scotiabank Caribbean Cultural Festival, Toronto, Canada

See also
 Cultural Exchanges festival, at De Montfort University, Leicester, England
 List of cultural and technical festivals in IITs and NITs, a list of cultural and technical festivals held in IITs and NITs in India